Lee So-young (born 31 August 1973) is South Korean manhwa artist. Her works, including Model and Arcana, are licensed by Tokyopop.

Works
 Model (1999)
 Check (2001)
 Arcana (2003)
 Horror Collector (2007)
 Blue Bird (2009)
 Yeonmo (2011–14)

References

1973 births
South Korean manhwa artists
South Korean manhwa writers
Living people
South Korean female comics artists
Female comics writers
South Korean women artists